Geetika Varde Qureshi is an Indian classical vocalist of the Jaipur-Atrauli gharana of Hindustani classical music and wife of percussionist Taufiq Qureshi.

She is also one of the graded artistes of All India Radio and a proud recipient of the prestigious 'Surmani' title from Sur Shringar Samsad. From light music to world music Geetika Varde Qureshi has performed in India as well as abroad, for example at the Trafalgar Square Festival 2006, adds the release.

Early life and background
Born to Mohini and Mohan Varde, she was brought up in the Shivaji Park area in Mumbai, along with her elder sister Laxmi. She studied at St. Xavier's College, Mumbai, where she met Taufiq Qureshi, whom she was to wed later.

She received vocal training from Manik Bhide, a noted vocalist of the Jaipur-Atrauli gharana, and also received a scholarship from ITC Sangeet Research Academy, Kolkata.

Career
Geetika Varde, although a trained professional classical singer of the Jaipur Gharana, is very inclined towards light-classical forms and composing. Having performed at classical and fusion concerts, she has conducted lecture-demonstrations and workshops at prestigious venues in India and abroad. For the release of her well appreciated solo album ‘ROOH’, Pandit Shivkumar Sharma referred to the couple as "Taufiq and Geetika are a perfect blend of rhythm and melody."

Personal life
Geetika Varde is married to Taufiq Qureshi and the couple have a son, Shikhar Naad. Though still studying, he learns tabla from his father and has performed at certain public concerts with him.

Tracks

Najariya: - It is a thumri-type called dadra. In this track, the artiste intricately explores the nuances of this form by making variations of the same line thereby bringing about a dramatic romance in the simple lyrics.

Yey Dil: - Purely a love song, this extremely soulful track is high on melody and expresses Geetika's deep love for her soul- mate.

Hey Maana:- It is a ballad- a slow moving sentimental song that drifts into a thoughtful mood- seeking to spread love and unify with the world in all its beauty and sunshine.

Hum Apne: - An old ghazal presentation this track emulates the artiste's profound love for the evergreen songs of the Hindi Film Industry.

Shyaam: - A touching bhajan by Saint Rasakhani on Lord Krishna, Geetika here has given a soulful rendition through her composition steeped in devotional melody. In this meditative track, she uses the word 'Shyaam' in beautiful variations.

Meera: - This composition on 'Meera' featured in Taufiq Qureshi's album 'Colours of Rajasthan', released by Music Today over a decade ago is a bhajan that depicts devotion to the extent of dedicating one's whole self and being, to the one and only Lord Krishna.

Tum Bin: - The track is a pure classical approach of singing, based on raga Bageshri. Blending the tenets of alaap-s, bolalaap-s and taan-s 'Tum Bin' is a spontaneous and an extempore unfolding of the raga but in a "fast forward" mode.

Ley Ailey: - A traditional folk song from Uttar Pradesh, the artiste here explores the possibilities of light classical style of singing, giving preference to bol banaav, playing with words and live singing rather than the fixed and repetitive way of folk.

References 

Indian women classical singers
Hindustani singers
Living people
Singers from Mumbai
St. Xavier's College, Mumbai alumni
Year of birth missing (living people)
Women musicians from Maharashtra